The People's Assembly of the Republic of Dagestan is the regional parliament of Dagestan, a federal subject of Russia. Its seat is in Makhachkala.

The parliament comprises 90 deputies. They are elected for five years by secret ballot and universal suffrage. The Chairman of the Council of Ministers is appointed by the State Council with the consent of the People's Assembly. Of that reason, the government of Dagestan is responsible and accountable to both the State Council and the People's Assembly.

Elections

2016

2021

See also
List of chairmen of the People's Assembly of the Republic of Dagestan

References

External links
Official website of the People's Assembly of Dagestan

Dagestan
Politics of Dagestan
Dagestan